Hopetoun is a town on the south coast of Western Australia in the Shire of Ravensthorpe.

History
Mary Ann Harbour was named in November 1865 by the sealer James Sale on the cutter Mary Ann.

Hopetoun was established in 1900 as the port servicing the Phillips River goldfield, named after the first Governor-General of Australia, John Hope, 7th Earl of Hopetoun. The townsite was gazetted on 9 February 1901.

The town became a shipping port for the mining industry, with a jetty built in 1901, the terminus of a railway line between Hopetoun and Ravensthorpe that operated from 1909 to 1935. The port was closed in 1937, with the jetty remaining until its destruction in 1983.

Some of the town's electricity is generated by a wind-diesel system. Hopetoun has two 600 kilowatt wind turbines and two low-load diesel generators.

The population in the 2016 Census was 871, a 38% fall from 1,398 in the 2011 Census, due to the closure of the nearby Ravensthorpe Nickel Mine. Hopetoun was a major site of accommodation for the mine, east of the town of Ravensthorpe. There is a primary school, police station and a doctor has clinics in both Hopetoun and Ravensthorpe. Hopetoun also has a hotel, tavern, bakery, IGA Supermarket, two cafes, post office/general store, hairdressers, beauty salon, CRC/library, chemist and two real estates .

References

Coastal towns in Western Australia
Shire of Ravensthorpe